Tom Spence (4 January 1962 – 28 April 2012) was a Scottish football player and manager. He was born in Airdrie, North Lanarkshire. Spence played for Stirling Albion, Clydebank, Clyde and Kilmarnock and was captain of the Stirling Albion team which defeated Selkirk 20–0 in 1984.

Former Cumnock, Thorniewood and Dunipace boss Tom - or Tam as he was better known - Spence died suddenly overnight, at the age of just 50.

References

External links 

1962 births
2012 deaths
Footballers from Airdrie, North Lanarkshire
Scottish footballers
Stirling Albion F.C. players
Alloa Athletic F.C. players
Cowdenbeath F.C. players
Clydebank F.C. (1965) players
Clyde F.C. players
Kilmarnock F.C. players
East Fife F.C. players
Albion Rovers F.C. players
Scottish Football League players
Scottish football managers
Albion Rovers F.C. managers
Scottish Football League managers
Association football fullbacks